Bistahieversor (meaning "Bistahi destroyer"), also known as the "Bisti Beast", is a genus of eutyrannosaurian tyrannosauroid dinosaur; the genus contains only a single known species, B. sealeyi, described in 2010, from the Late Cretaceous of New Mexico. The holotype and a juvenile were found in the Hunter Wash Member of the Kirtland Formation, while other specimens came from the underlying Fossil Forest member of the Fruitland Formation. This dates Bistahieversor approximately 75.5 to 74.5 million years ago, found in sediments spanning a million years.

Discovery and naming

The first remains now attributed to Bistahieversor, a partial skull and skeleton, were described in 1990 as a specimen of Aublysodon. Additional remains, consisting of the incomplete skull and skeleton of a juvenile, were described in 1992. Another, complete, skull and partial skeleton were found in the Bisti/De-Na-Zin Wilderness Area of New Mexico in 1998, known colloquially as the "Bisti Beast". 

In a 2000 paper, Thomas Carr and Thomas Williamson re-examined these four specimens and suggested that they did not belong to Aublysodon, but rather to one or more new species of Daspletosaurus. However, it was not until 2010 that Carr and Williamson published a thorough re-description of the specimens and found that they belonged to a new genus and species of more generalized tyrannosauroid, which they named Bistahieversor sealeyi.

The name Bistahieversor comes from the Navajo , or "place of the adobe formations" in reference to the Bisti/De-Na-Zin Wilderness Area where it was found, and eversor, meaning "destroyer."

Description

Material from both adolescent and adult individuals has been found in the Kirtland and Fruitland formations of New Mexico, United States. The snout is deep, indicating that the feature is not unique to more derived tyrannosaurs such as Tyrannosaurus. Geographical barriers such as the newly forming Rocky Mountains may have isolated the more southerly Bistahieversor from more derived northern tyrannosaurs. In 2010 Gregory S. Paul estimated a length of 8 meters (26 ft) and a weight of 2.5 metric tons (2.75 short tons). In 2016 Molina-Pérez and Larramendi gave a length of 9 meters (29.5 ft) and a weight of 3.3 metric tons (3.6 short tons).

Bistahieversor differs from other tyrannosaurs in the possession of 64 teeth, an extra opening above the eye, and a keel along the lower jaw, among many other unique traits. The opening above the eye is thought to have accommodated an air sac that would have lightened the skull's weight. Bistahieversor also had a complex joint at its "forehead" that would have stabilized the skull, preventing movement at the joint.

Classification

Bistahieversor is a genus of derived dinosaur currently classified in the subfamily Tyrannosaurinae. It is more derived than Teratophoneus but less derived than Lythronax. It forms the sister taxon of a group including Lythronax, Nanuqsaurus, Tyrannosaurus, Tarbosaurus and Zhuchengtyrannus.

Below is a cladogram illustrating the relationships of all tyrannosaurid genera:

The cladogram below is based on a phylogenetic analysis conducted by Voris et al. in 2020. Here, Bistahieversor was recovered as a basal member of Eutyrannosauria rather than as a tyrannosaurine:

Paleobiology

A 2020 study of the endocranial morphology of Bistahieversor shed light on its hunting behaviors. The large olfactory bulbs indicate a heightened sense of smell, while the elongated semi-circular canals implied increased agility and sophisticated gaze stabilization while the head was moving. Bistahieversor possessed binocular vision, allowing it to see better than more primitive predatory dinosaurs. The study noted that while Bistahieversor had small optic lobes, this was not a strong indicator of whether this dinosaur possessed poor vision.

See also

 2010 in paleontology
 Timeline of tyrannosaur research

References

External links 
 Article about Bistahieversor on DinosaurusBlog webpage (in Czech)

Tyrannosaurs
Late Cretaceous dinosaurs of North America
Fossil taxa described in 2010
Monotypic dinosaur genera
Taxa named by Thomas Carr
Paleontology in New Mexico
Campanian genus first appearances
Campanian genus extinctions